Vijayasri was an Indian actress who predominantly worked in Malayalam cinema in the 1970s. She acted in many movies opposite Prem Nazir and have also worked in Tamil, Hindi, Telugu and Kannada films.

Biography
Her first appearance onscreen was in the Tamil film Chitthi (1966). Her first film in Malayalam was Poojapushpam (1969), directed by the patriarch Thikkurissy Sukumaran Nair. She ended up being a part of 3 of the 6 movies Thikkurissy directed in his  prolific career as a director. She also got to share screen space with the leading lady of the times, Sheela in her debut movie itself.

She gained popularity due to her beauty in the Malayalam film history. She was a contemporary of the popular Malayalam actress Jayabharathi. Her most notable films are Angathattu (1973), Postmane Kananilla (1972), Lanka Dahanam (1971), Maravil Thirivu Sookshikkuka (1972), Pacha Nottukal (1973), Taxi Car (1972), Aromalunni (1972) and Ponnapuram Kotta (1973). In all these films, she starred opposite Prem Nazir and the Prem Nazir-Vijayasree pair created biggest hits in box office. "Theirs was the most successful pair in Malayalam cinema ever, I cannot think of a single film of theirs flopping." says R. Gopalakrishnan, one of the senior-most still photographers in Malayalam cinema. Many of her movies are directed by Kunchacko. At the end of her career, she parted ways with Kunchacko and joined with P. Subramaniam.
She also acted in a number of Tamil films but in supporting roles. She had played an important role in Babu (1971), a Sivaji Ganesan starrer, as the pair of Sivaji who is killed early in the story. She had also acted opposite Gemini Ganesh in Chitthi, a hit. Other notable ones are Deivamagan (1970), Adhe Kangal (1967) and Kulavilakku (1968).

Many celebrities praised the beauty of Vijayasree. "She is the most beautiful woman I have ever met", said director Bharathan to his associate, Jayaraj, once. "She was verily the Marilyn Monroe of Malayalam. No other actress had as many male admirers as she had. No other actress had as many hits as her in such a short span of time. No actress had made such a sudden impact in Malayalam cinema. People went to the theatre to see her, and that is something that has not happened before (her time)", said Jayaraj. He directed a film Naayika, by which the character in the movie named "Vani" (played by actress Sarayu) portrays slight resemblance to Vijayasree's life. "If Jayan epitomised the essence in manly beauty among male actors, then there has never been an actress in Malayalam whose voluptuous beauty compared to Vijayasree's. Her graceful statuesque beauty was almost a symbol of God's artistry", said actor Kaduvakulam Antony. Many actors and directors said, due to the bad fate, Malayalam film fans could not see the great Jayan-Vijayasree combination on the screen. "She was extremely beautiful of course, but she was a capable performer too.", said actor Raghavan.

She committed suicide at the age of 21 on 17 March 1974. 

Vijayasree loved children with all her innocence, she used to distribute sweets or candies whenever she saw children nearby.

Filmography

Malayalam

 Youvanam (1974) as Minikutti
 Alakal (1974)
 Jeevikkan Marannupoya Sthree (1974)
 Ajnathavasam (1973) as Kunjulakshmi
 Angathattu (1973) as Archa
 Padmavyooham (1973) as Jaya, Rani (Double role)
 Panchavadi (1973) as Nalini
 Veendum Prabhatham (1973) as Sarojam
 Pavangal Pennungal (1973)
 Ponnapuram Kotta (1973)
 Thiruvabharanam (1973)
 Swargaputhri (1973) as Lisy
 Thenaruvi (1973) as Neeli
 Pacha Nottukal (1973) as Leenamma
 Thaniniram (1973) as Radha
 Prethangalude Thazhvara (1973)
 Kaadu (1973) as Maala
 Aromalunni (1972)
 Manthrakodi (1972)
 Maravil Thirivu Sookshikkuka (1972) as Indumathi
 Postmane Kananilla (1972) as Kamalam
 Pushpanjali (1972) as Usha
 Adyathe Kadha (1972) as Rajakumari
 Anweshanam (1972)
 Maaya (1972) as Kamala
 Professor (1972) as Mayadevi
 Sree Guruvayoorappan (1972)
 Sambhavami Yuge Yuge (1972) as Sumathy
 Taxi Car (1972) as Rani
 Shiksha (1971) as Dancer
 Bobanum Moliyum (1971)
 Lanka Dahanam (1971) as Rajani
 Marunnattil Oru Malayali (1971) as Geetha
 Achante Bharya (1971) as Omana
 Palunkupaathram (1970)
 Dathuputhran (1970) as Vanaja
 Othenante Makan (1970) as Kunji Kunki
 Detective 909 Keralathil (1970)
 Rakthapushpam (1970)
 Poojapushpam (1969)

Hindi
Kundan

Tamil

 Chitthi (1966)
 Adhey Kangal (1967)
 Naan (1967)
 Kulavilakku (1968)
 Naalum Therindhavan (1968)
 Neeyum Naanum (1968)
 Deiva Magan (1969)
 Thalattu (1969)
 Nilave Nee Satchi (1970)
 Thedi Vandha Mappillai (1970)
 Kathal Jothi (1970)
 Babu (1971)
 Yanai Valartha Vanampadi Magan (1971)
 Delhi To Madras (1972)
 Kanimuthu Paappa (1972)
 Maru Piravi (1973)
 Malai Naattu Mangai (1973)
 Akkarai Pachai (1974) - Last movie in Tamil

Kannada

 Bangalore Mail (1968)
 Broker Bheeshmachari (1969)
 Sri Krishnadevaraya (1970)
 Naguva Hoovu (1970)
 Kasturi Nivasa (1971)
 Nanda Gokula (1972)
 Janma Rahasya (1972)

Telugu
 Bhimanjaneya Yuddham (1966)
 Rangula Ratnam (1966)
 Manchi Kutumbam (1968)
 Prema Kanuka (1969)
 Jeevitha Chakram (1971)
 Kiladi Bullodu (1972)
 Dora Babu (1974)

References

External links
Vijayasree at MSI

20th-century Indian actresses
Actresses from Thiruvananthapuram
1974 deaths
Indian film actresses
Actresses in Malayalam cinema
Actresses in Tamil cinema
1953 births
Actresses in Telugu cinema
Actresses in Hindi cinema
Actresses in Kannada cinema
1974 suicides